Darren Billy, Jr., professionally known as Lab Ox, is a Grammy award-winning American hip-hop, R&B, pop rock, R&B, urban and pop producer from Houston, Texas. He has produced and written songs for artists and groups including Gary Clark Jr., Rihanna, Willow Smith, James Fauntleroy, Nicki Minaj, 50 Cent, Lloyd Banks, G-Unit, Drake, and Yolanda Adams. He was the first producer signed to Jay-Z's record label Roc Nation upon the labels launch in 2009, and remained active on the label until his departure in early 2016.

Early career

Lab Ox got his start in the record industry with 50 Cent as a producer on former G-Unit artist Hot Rod's demo project. On August 17, 2007, he produced a record which 50 Cent released, aimed at Lil Wayne, entitled Part Time Lover. The record would later be featured on the mix-tape Sabrina's Baby Boy, the last in the "G-Unit Radio" mix-tape.

Production and songwriting credits

2007 - present

References

External links

1985 births
Living people
L
People from Houston
Musicians from New Orleans